Clairefontaine may refer to:

 INF Clairefontaine, France national football centre
 CNFE Clairefontaine, France national women's football centre
 Clairefontaine-en-Yvelines, commune in the Yvelines department of the Île-de-France region in north-central France
 Étival-Clairefontaine, commune in the Vosges department in Grand Est in northeastern France
 Clairefontaine paper mills, French paper company
 Clairefontaine Abbey, Belgian hamlet belonging to the city of Arlon

See also
 Clairfontaine, commune in the Aisne department of the Hauts-de-France region in northern France